Birthmarks is the third studio album by Canadian rock band Born Ruffians, released on April 16, 2013, by Paper Bag Records in Canada and Yep Roc Records worldwide. The band released a limited edition deluxe version of the album on March 25, 2014 that included a second disc with outtakes, unreleased tracks and acoustic versions. The third track from the second disc "Oh Cecilia" was released only on CD, YouTube, and SoundCloud due to sample use restrictions. On September 13, 2022, they re-released a censored version of the song through audio streaming services for the first time.

Track listing

References

External links
Born Ruffians website

2013 albums
Born Ruffians albums
Paper Bag Records albums
Yep Roc Records albums